The Ivory Coast national under-17 football team, nicknamed Les petit Éléphants ("The Little Elephants" in French), represents Ivory Coast in international football at an under-17 level and is controlled by the Ivorian Football Federation. The team's first appearance on the world stage was in 1987 at the 1987 FIFA U-16 World Championship in Canada where they achieved third place after a 2-1 extra time victory over Italy in the third place playoff.

Current squad 
 The following players were called up for the 2023 Africa U-17 Cup of Nations qualification matches.
 Match dates: 12, 15 and 18 June 2022
 Opposition: ,  and 
 Caps and goals correct as of: 18 January 2021, after the match against 

 Honours 
 Africa U-17 Cup of Nations Champions (1): 2013
 Third (1): 2005
 FIFA U-17 World Cup: Third (1): 1987

Tournament Records

 FIFA U-16 and U-17 World Cup record 
{| class="wikitable" style="text-align: center;font-size:90%;"
!colspan=8|FIFA U-16 and U-17 World Cup
|-
!colspan=8|Appearances: 4
|-
!Year
!Round
!PLD
!W
!D*
!L
!GS
!GA
|- 
| 1985||rowspan=1 colspan=7|Did not enter
|- style="background:#cd7f32;"
| 1987||Third Place'||5||3||1||1||7||6
|- 
| 1989||rowspan=1 colspan=7|Did not qualify|-
| 1991||rowspan=2 colspan=7|Walkover|-   
| 1993
|-   
| 1995||rowspan=3 colspan=7|Did not qualify|-   
| 1997
|-   
| 1999
|- 
| 2001||rowspan=1 colspan=7|Walkover|-
| 2003||rowspan=1 colspan=7|Did not qualify|-
| 2005||Group Stage||3||0||1||2||4||8
|-
| 2007||rowspan=2 colspan=7|Did not qualify|-      
| 2009
|-   
| 2011||Round of 16||4||1||1||2||10||10
|-
| 2013||Quarterfinals||5||2||1||2||7||5
|-
| 2015||rowspan=3 colspan=7|Did not qualify|-
| 2017
|-
| 2019
|-
| 2021||colspan=7|'To be determined
|-
|Total||4/19||17||6||4||7||28||29
|}

CAF U-17 Championship record

CAF U-16 and U-17 World Cup Qualifiers record 

Denotes draws include knockout matches decided on penalty kicks.

References

External links 
  Ivory Coast national under-17 football team - official site of FIF

African national under-17 association football teams
under-17